Okolona may refer to a place in the United States:

 Okolona, Arkansas
 Okolona (Middletown, Delaware), listed on the National Register of Historic Places in New Castle County, Delaware
 Okolona, Louisville, Kentucky
 Okolona, Mississippi
 Okolona, Ohio